Umm ‘Ubayda , also spelled Umm ‘Abida, is a village in Al-Maimouna District of Maysan Governorate, Iraq. Located in the marshy Batihah region of southern Iraq, it is known for being the home and burial site of the 12th-century Sufi saint Ahmad al-Rifa'i, the eponymous founder of the Rifa'i Sufi order. Ibn Battuta visited Umm Ubayda in 1327. He wrote that the Rifa'i community had a large ribat there at the time, home to "thousands" of dervishes.

References 

Populated places in Maysan Province